Amaryllis is a Polish progressive rock band, founded in 2004 in Prudnik by Ewa Domagała and Marek Domagała.

History 

The band was founded in Prudnik at the turn of 2004 and 2005. Its name comes from the only genus in the subtribe Amaryllidinae, Amaryllis. Some time later, a lutenist and theorbist Henryk Kasperczak, bassist Wojciech Bielejewski, drummer Grzegorz Dziamka and keyboardist Jacek Winkiel joined the band.

In 2005, Amaryllis, as a septet, released its first demo. In the Autumn of the same year, Piotr Jackowiak became the manager of the band. At the turn of 2005 and 2006, drummer Kacper Stachowiak, bassist Szymon Guzowski and keyboardist Bartłomiej Stankowiak joined the band.

In the summer of 2006 the band played its first live shows. At that time, Ewa Domagała was temporarily replaced by different vocalists due to her pregnancy. She returned to the group in October. After her return, Amaryllis started to work on their first single "Prologos". Its premiere took place on 13 December 2006 during a concert in Blue Note club in Poznań.

In May 2007 the band won a Grand Prix of Spring Rock Festival, and in June they won Song of Songs Festival in Toruń. Thanks to that, they were able to record their first music video for the song "Abyssus". It was recorded in 2008 by Rafał Jerzak.

On 17 September 2009, Amaryllis released their first studio album titled Inquietum Est Cor.

In 2010, the band participated in eliminations to Woodstock Festival Poland in Kostrzyn nad Odrą and got into semifinals in Gdynia.

Musical style and lyrics 

All of their texts are written in Latin. The lyrics of the band are characterized by the treatment of Christianity. Amaryllis, however, do not consider themselves a religious band. Amaryllis is considered to be the first rock band to sing entirely in Latin.

The music is inspired by the early religious music.

The band states that their main influences are Rush and Frankie Goes to Hollywood.

Personnel

Final lineup 
 Ewa Domagała – vocals
 Marek Domagała – guitar
 Henryk Kasperczak – lute, theorbo
 Kacper Stachowiak – drums
 Łukasz Kulczak – guitar
 Szymon Guzowski – bass guitar
 Bartłomiej Stankowski – keyboard

Former members 
 Wojciech Bielejewski – bass guitar
 Grzegorz Dziamka – drums
 Jacek Winkiel – keyboard

Discography 

 Demo (2005)
 Prologos (single; 2006)
 Abyssus (single; 2008)
 Inquietum Est Cor (2009)

Timeline

References

External links 

 

2004 establishments in Poland
Musical groups established in 2004
Polish progressive metal musical groups
Polish progressive rock groups
Prudnik
Musicians from Poznań